Brandon McMillan (born March 22, 1990) is a Canadian professional ice hockey player. He is currently playing with HC Ambrì-Piotta of the National League (NL). He was drafted by the Anaheim Ducks in the third round (85th overall) of the 2008 NHL Entry Draft. He is from Ladner and Tsawwassen in Delta, BC.

Playing career
McMillan began his major junior career with the Kelowna Rockets of the WHL in 2006–07. After a 25-goal, 67-point campaign in his fourth season with the Rockets in 2009–10, he was named to the WHL East First All-Star Team.

Turning professional for the 2010–11 season, McMillan played 16 games for Anaheim's AHL affiliate, the Syracuse Crunch before making his NHL debut on November 21, 2010, suiting up with the Ducks for a home game loss against the visiting Edmonton Oilers.

On April 3, 2013, McMillan was dealt by the Ducks at the trade deadline to the Phoenix Coyotes in exchange for Matthew Lombardi.

On February 12, 2015, McMillan was claimed off waivers by the Vancouver Canucks. He then spent the 2015-16 season in Germany, playing for DEL side ERC Ingolstadt (31 games: 13 goals, three assists). In June 2016, he inked a deal with Medvescak Zagreb of the Kontinental Hockey League (KHL). He left the Zagreb team in November 2016 and transferred to fellow KHL outfit Torpedo Nizhny Novgorod. He played out the season with Torpedo, contributing with 5 goals and 9 points in 24 games.

On July 6, 2017, McMillan continued his tenure in the KHL, joining his third club in Dinamo Riga on a one-year contract. He was later traded to Avangard Omsk He later became a free agent prior to signing with HC Neftekhimik Nizhnekamsk in early December of 2020.

Career statistics

Regular season and playoffs

International

Awards and honours

References

External links

 

1990 births
Living people
HC Ambrì-Piotta players
Anaheim Ducks draft picks
Anaheim Ducks players
Arizona Coyotes players
Avangard Omsk players
Canadian ice hockey left wingers
Dinamo Riga players
Ice hockey people from British Columbia
ERC Ingolstadt players
Kelowna Rockets players
KHL Medveščak Zagreb players
HC Neftekhimik Nizhnekamsk players
Norfolk Admirals players
People from Delta, British Columbia
Phoenix Coyotes players
Portland Pirates players
Syracuse Crunch players
Torpedo Nizhny Novgorod players
Vancouver Canucks players
Canadian expatriate ice hockey players in Croatia
Canadian expatriate ice hockey players in Latvia
Canadian expatriate ice hockey players in Germany
Canadian expatriate ice hockey players in Russia